The 2017 McDonald's All-American Girls Game is an All-Star basketball game that was played on March 29, 2017, at the United Center in Chicago, Illinois, home of the Chicago Bulls. The game's rosters featured the best and most highly recruited high school girls graduating in 2017.  The game is the 16th annual version of the McDonald's All-American Game first played in 2002.

2017 Game
The East won the game in overtime, 80-74. They had to overcome a 13-point deficit in the game to force the game into overtime after tying the score at 69 in regulation. Rellah Boothe - the Game MVP - hit huge consecutive 3-pointers to push the East. Boothe had 18 points, 9 rebounds, and 2 blocks.

The West jumped out early due to some heady guard play from Alexis Morris and then tried to keep the lead and make a comeback in overtime with the post play of Loretta Kakala. Kakala finished with 11 points, 6 rebounds, and 2 steals.

2017 East Roster

2017 West Roster

Coaches
The East team was coached by:
 Head Coach —  Laney Clement-Holbrook  of Oliver Ames High School (North Easton, Massachusetts)

The West team was coached by:
 Head Coach - Russell L. Ninemire of Sandy Creek High School (Fairfield, Nebraska)

See also
2017 McDonald's All-American Boys Game

References

External links
McDonald's All-American on the web

2017 in American women's basketball
2017